Ivica Jelić (28 September 1917 – 17 April 1989) was a Yugoslav gymnast. He competed at the 1948 Summer Olympics and the 1952 Summer Olympics.

References

1917 births
1989 deaths
Yugoslav male artistic gymnasts
Olympic gymnasts of Yugoslavia
Gymnasts at the 1948 Summer Olympics
Gymnasts at the 1952 Summer Olympics
Place of birth missing